Bagh Dai-ye Olya (also Romanized as Bāgh Dā’ī-ye ‘Olyā) is a village in Robat Rural District, in the Central District of Khorramabad County, Lorestan Province, Iran. At the 2006 census, its population was 61, in 11 families.

References 

Towns and villages in Khorramabad County